Purgatory is, in Roman Catholic and other religious teachings, a temporary state of the dead.

Purgatory may also refer to:

Literature 
Purgatorio (Purgatory), the second part of Dante's Divine Comedy
Purgatory (drama), a 1938 play by William Butler Yeats
Purgatory (2000 AD), a Judge Dredd comics spinoff story
Purgatori, a fictional Chaos! Comics character
Purgatory, in DC Comics, a Green Lantern enemy

Film and television

Film 
Purgatory, a 1998 Russian television film by Alexander Nevzorov
Purgatory (1999 film), an American Western fantasy television film directed by Uli Edel
Purgatory (2007 film), a Spanish short film
Purgatory, Colorado, a fictional town in the 1971 film Support Your Local Gunfighter!

Television 
Purgatory (TV series), a 2017–2018 Armenian mystery drama series
"Purgatory" (Arrow), an episode
"Purgatory" (Law & Order: Criminal Intent), an episode
"Purgatory" (Third Watch), an episode

Music

Artists 
 Purgatory (band), an Indonesian heavy metal band
 Iced Earth, previously named Purgatory, an American heavy metal band

Albums 
 Purgatory (Borealis album) or the title song, 2015
 Purgatory (The Tossers album) or the title song, 2003
 Purgatory (Tyler Childers album) or the title song, 2017
 Purgatory (Despised Icon album), 2019

Songs 
 "Purgatory" (song), by Iron Maiden, 1981
 "Purgatory", by Kim Petras from Turn Off the Light, 2019

Opera 
Purgatory, a 1958 opera by Hugo Weisgall based on Yeats's drama
Purgatory, a 1966 opera by Gordon Crosse based on Yeats's drama

Other uses 
 Purgatory Correctional Facility, the county jail of Washington County, Utah, US
 Purgatory Resort, a ski area in Colorado, US
 Purgatory Chasm State Reservation, a geologic state park in Sutton, Massachusetts
 Purgatory Conglomerate, a geologic unit named for Purgatory Chasm

See also 
 St. Patrick's Purgatory, an ancient pilgrimage site on Station Island in Lough Derg, County Donegal, Ireland
 Purgatorio (disambiguation)
 Purgatoire (disambiguation)
Pugatory, an animated webseries created by Marzia Kjellberg